George Matthews (September 23, 1912 – June 28, 1982) was a jazz trombonist.

Career 
Matthews was adept on tuba, trumpet, and trombone. He received classical training in New York City and played with local dance and jazz bands before joining Tiny Bradshaw's group in the early-1930s. He worked later in the 1930s with Willie Bryant, Louis Armstrong, Chick Webb, and Ella Fitzgerald. After World War II, Matthews worked extensively with Count Basie, then joined Erskine Hawkins's group in the early 1950s. In the 1960s he played with Lucille Dixon and Clark Terry, among others.

Discography
 Cannonball Adderley, African Waltz (Riverside, 1961)
 Count Basie, Brand New Wagon (Bluebird, 1990)
 Count Basie, Shoutin' Blues 1949 (Bluebird, 1993)
 Ray Charles, Genius + Soul = Jazz (Impulse!, 1961)
 Ella Fitzgerald, Newport Jazz Festival Live at Carnegie Hall July 5, 1973 (CBS, 1973)
 Ella Fitzgerald, Live from the Roseland Ballroom New York 1940 (Sunbeam, 1974)
 Lucky Millinder with Sister Rosetta Tharpe, Lucky Days 1941–1945 (MCA, 1980)

With Dizzy Gillespie
 Afro (Norgran, 1954)
 Dizzy and Strings (Norgran, 1954)
 Carnegie Hall Concert (Verve, 1961)

With Dicky Wells
 Bones for the King (Felsted, 1958)
 Trombone Four-in-Hand (Felsted, 1959)

References
 
Eugene Chadbourne, [ George Matthews] at Allmusic

External links
 George Matthews recordings at the Discography of American Historical Recordings.

1912 births
1982 deaths
American jazz trombonists
Male trombonists
20th-century American musicians
20th-century trombonists
20th-century American male musicians
American male jazz musicians
Dominica emigrants to the United States